Life For Life's Sake: A Book of Reminiscences is a book of memoirs written by Richard Aldington and published by the Viking Press in 1941.  Chapter IX deals with the early history of Imagism.

British autobiographies
Viking Press books
1941 non-fiction books